Patricia C. Quinn (née Lyons; b. 23 April 1927), best known by her former married name Pat Appleyard, is a British former rally driver and co-driver. She is the daughter of Jaguar Cars founder Sir William Lyons. Co-driving with her then-husband, Ian Appleyard, she won the Alpine Rally's Coupe des Alpes each year from 1950 to 1953, in one of her father's company's Jaguar XK120 cars. On the third of these triumphs, in 1952, the Appleyards were the first crew ever to be awarded the event's Coupe d'Or (Gold Cup), for having won three consecutive Coupes des Alpes. During their competitive career the couple's major event victories also included the 1951 and 1953 RAC Rallies, and the 1951 Tulip Rally, and they were runners-up in the 1953 European Rally Championship. Her own driving career was less successful than her husband's, a fact that she herself partly put down to being unable to find suitably qualified female co-drivers, but nevertheless, she won a number of ladies' trophies in British events.

Patricia Appleyard remarried in 1962, and latterly became well known as a farmer of rare breed livestock, including Cotswold sheep and English Longhorn cattle, at her farm in the Cotswolds.

References

1927 births
Living people
British rally co-drivers
English rally drivers
Female rally drivers
English female racing drivers